The Women's 100 Butterfly event at the 11th FINA World Aquatics Championships swam on 24–25 July 2005 in Montreal, Canada. Preliminary and Semifinal heats swam on 24 July.  The Final swam in the evening session of 25 July.

At the start of the event, the existing World (WR) and Championships (CR) records were:
WR: 56.61 swum by Inge de Bruijn (Netherlands) on 17 September 2000 in Sydney, Australia
CR: 57.96 swum by Jenny Thompson (USA) on 21 July 2003 in Barcelona, Spain

Results

Final

Semifinals

Preliminaries

References

Women's 100 metre butterfly
Swimming at the 2005 World Aquatics Championships
World Aquatics Championships 100 metre butterfly